Vladimir Krivulya is a Russian Paralympic powerlifter. He represented Russia at the 2012 Summer Paralympics held in London, United Kingdom and he won the bronze medal in the men's 52 kg event.

At the 2014 World Championships he won the silver medal in the men's 54 kg event. At the 2019 World Championships he won the gold medal in this event.

References

External links 
 

Living people
Year of birth missing (living people)
Place of birth missing (living people)
Powerlifters at the 2012 Summer Paralympics
Medalists at the 2012 Summer Paralympics
Paralympic bronze medalists for Russia
Paralympic medalists in powerlifting
Paralympic powerlifters of Russia
21st-century Russian people